In Christianity, the three evangelical counsels, or counsels of perfection, are chastity, poverty (or perfect charity), and obedience. As stated by Jesus in the canonical gospels, they are counsels for those who desire to become "perfect". The Catholic Church interprets this to mean that they are not binding upon all, and hence not necessary conditions to attain eternal life (heaven), but that they are "acts of supererogation" exceeding the minimum stipulated in the biblical commandments. Catholics who have made a public profession to order their lives by the evangelical counsels, and confirmed this by public vows before their competent church authority (the act of religious commitment known as a profession), are recognised as members of the consecrated life.

Consecrated life 

There are early forms of religious vows in the monastic traditions. The Rule of Saint Benedict (ch. 58.17) stipulates for its adherents what has come to be known as the "Benedictine vows", promising "stability, conversion of manners and obedience". Religious vows in the form of the three evangelical counsels of chastity, poverty, and obedience were first made in the twelfth century by Francis of Assisi and his followers,  the first of the mendicant orders. These vows are made now by the members of all Roman Catholic religious institutes founded subsequently (cf. 1983 Code of Canon Law, can. 573) and constitute the basis of their other regulations of their life and conduct.

Members of religious institutes confirm their intention to observe the evangelical counsels by making a "public" vow, that is, a vow that the superior of the religious institute accepts in the name of the Church. Outside the consecrated life, Christians are free to make a private vow to observe one or more of the evangelical counsels; but a private vow does not have the same binding and other effects in church law as a public vow.

A young man in the Gospel asked what he should do to obtain eternal life, and Jesus told him to "keep the commandments", but when the young man pressed further, Christ told him: "If thou wilt be perfect, go sell what thou hast, and give to the poor". It is from this passage that the term "counsel of perfection" comes.  Again in the Gospels, Jesus speaks of "eunuchs who have made themselves eunuchs for the kingdom of heaven", and added "He that can receive it, let him receive it".  St. Paul presses home the duty incumbent on all Christians of keeping free from all sins of the flesh, and of fulfilling the obligations of the married state, if they have taken those obligations upon themselves, but also gives his "counsel" in favor of the unmarried state and of perfect chastity (celibacy), on the ground that it is thus more possible to serve God with an undivided allegiance.

Indeed, the danger in the Early Church, even in Apostolic times, was not that the "counsels" would be neglected or denied, but that they should be exalted into commands of universal obligation, "forbidding to marry", and imposing poverty as a duty on all.

These counsels have been analyzed as a way to keep the world from distracting the soul, on the grounds that the principal good things of this world easily divide themselves into three classes. There are the riches which make life easy and pleasant, there are the pleasures of the flesh which appeal to the appetites, and, lastly, there are honors and positions of authority which delight the self-love of the individual. These three matters, in themselves often innocent and not forbidden to the devout Christian, may yet, even when no kind of sin is involved, hold back the soul from its true aim and vocation, and delay it from becoming entirely conformed to the will of God. It is, therefore, the object of the three counsels of perfection to free the soul from these hindrances. The love of riches is opposed by the counsel of poverty, the pleasures of the flesh (even the lawful pleasures of holy matrimony) are excluded by the counsel of chastity, while the desire for worldly power and honor is met by the counsel of holy obedience. Abstinence from unlawful indulgence in any of these directions is expected of all Christians as a matter of precept. The further voluntary abstinence from what is in itself lawful is the subject of the counsels, and such abstinence is not in itself meritorious, but only becomes so when it is done for the sake of Christ, and in order to be more free to serve him.

The Catholic Encyclopedia article ends with the following summary:

Criticisms of supererogatory interpretation of evangelical counsels 
In a 1523 essay, Martin Luther criticized the evangelical counsels to be supererogatory, and the two-tiered system to be a sophistic corruption of the teaching of Christ, intended to accommodate the vices of the aristocracy:
You are perturbed over Christ's injunction in Matthew 5, 'Do not resist evil, but make friends with your accuser; and if any one should take your coat, let him have your cloak as well.' ... The sophists in the universities have also been perplexed by these texts. ... In order not to make heathen of the princes, they taught that Christ did not demand these things but merely offered them as advice or counsel to those who would be perfect. So Christ had to become a liar and be in error in order that the princes might come off with honor, for they could not exalt the princes without degrading Christ—wretched blind sophists that they are. And their poisonous error has spread thus to the whole world until everyone regards these teachings of Christ not as precepts binding on all Christians alike but as mere counsels for the perfect.

Dietrich Bonhoeffer argues that the interpretation of the evangelical counsels to be supererogatory acquiesces in what he calls "cheap grace", lowering the standard of Christian teaching:
The difference between ourselves and the rich young man is that he was not allowed to solace his regrets by saying: 'Never mind what Jesus says, I can still hold on to my riches, but in a spirit of inner detachment. Despite my inadequacy I can take comfort in the thought that God has forgiven me my sins and can have fellowship with Christ in faith.' But no, he went away sorrowful. Because he would not obey, he could not believe. In this the young man was quite honest. He went away from Jesus and indeed this honesty had more promise than any apparent communion with Jesus based on disobedience.

See also

Ministry of Jesus
Essenes
The Perfecti, members of the Cathars who also led ascetic lives of chastity and abstinence, though most followers followed easier rules of conduct.

References

External links
Section on the Consecrated Life in The Code of Canon Law, 1983, including canons 599-601 concerning the Evangelical Counsels
A Quaker Perspective on the Counsels, the Powers & Community

Religious (Catholicism)
Christian ethics
Doctrines and teachings of Jesus
Christian terminology